Julius Carl Fritz Manteuffel (11 January 1875 in Berlin – 21 April 1941 in Berlin) was a German gymnast.  He competed at the 1896 Summer Olympics in Athens.

Manteuffel was a member of the German team that won two gold medals by placing first in both of the team events, the parallel bars and the horizontal bar.  He also competed in the parallel bars, horizontal bar, vault, and pommel horse individual events, though without success.

References

External links

1875 births
1941 deaths
German male artistic gymnasts
Gymnasts at the 1896 Summer Olympics
19th-century sportsmen
Gymnasts at the 1900 Summer Olympics
Olympic medalists in gymnastics
Olympic gold medalists for Germany
Medalists at the 1896 Summer Olympics
Gymnasts from Berlin